The 1995 Sudirman Cup was the fourth tournament of the World Mixed Team Badminton Championships. It was held from May 17 to May 20, 1995 in Lausanne, Switzerland.

Results
49 teams participated in this edition of Sudirman Cup. Nigeria entered but ultimately did not participate.

Group 1

Subgroup A

Subgroup B

Relegation playoff

Semifinals

Final

Group 2

Group 3

Group 4

Group 5

Group 6

Group 7

Group 8

Group 9

Group 10

Group 11

Final classification

References

External links
 China upsets Indonesia to take Sudirman Cup

Sudirman Cup
Sudirman Cup
Sudirman Cup
Sudirman Cup